The Dolphins–Patriots rivalry is an American football rivalry between the National Football League (NFL)'s Miami Dolphins and New England Patriots. The Dolphins lead the all-time series 60–55. Because both teams are members of the American Football Conference (AFC) East division, the two teams have been scheduled to play twice (home and away) every regular season since 1967.

Characteristics and history

While not as famous as some other rivalries, the rivalry has a long history that dates back to the 1960s. The beginning of the rivalry was dominated by the Dolphins, as at the time the Dolphins were one of the NFL's most successful teams, while the Patriots were one of the worst. This trend would change during the early 2000s when the Patriots became more and more successful, eventually culminating with the Brady & Belichick dynasty, while the Dolphins, and the rest of the AFC East, would become mired in mediocrity. The Patriots finally made the Super Bowl in 1985, having defeated Miami in the AFC Championship game to get there.

Starting in 1986, the rivalry was a little bit more even, with the Pats having a 7-game winning streak from 1986 to 1988. The Dolphins then took over the rivalry once again, winning 13 of the next 15 matchups between the 2 teams. Both teams had great quarterbacks in the 1990s, with the Patriots having Drew Bledsoe and the Dolphins with Dan Marino, both of whom appeared in at least one Super Bowl; Marino in Super Bowl XIX and Bledsoe in Super Bowl XXXI. The Dolphins continued to dominate the rivalry through the late 1990s with the Dolphins sweeping the Patriots in back to back years, 1999 and 2000.

Miami is one of 4 teams in the AFC with a winning overall record against New England (the others being the Cleveland Browns, Denver Broncos, and Kansas City Chiefs).  Since 2003, the Patriots have dominated the rivalry, but not as much as their rivalries with their two other AFC East opponents. In 2004, one of the most famous moments in the rivalry happened where the Dolphins, 2–11 at the time, upset the defending champion Patriots, who were 12–1, in a game that has been known as "The Night That Courage Wore Orange". The rivalry briefly intensified in 2005 when Nick Saban (who previously served as defensive coordinator of the Cleveland Browns, coached by Bill Belichick at the time) was hired as the Dolphins head coach and when he nearly signed quarterback Drew Brees with the Dolphins, as well as in 2008 when the Dolphins became the only team other than the Patriots since 2003 to win the division. In Week 3 of the aforementioned 2008 season, the Dolphins used the Wildcat formation to throw the Patriots (who were without Tom Brady that year because of an ACL injury earlier in the season) off and went on to upset them, 38–13, snapping their 20-game regular season winning streak that dated back to December 10, 2006, which coincidentally, the Patriots were also beat by the Dolphins. In 2018, the Dolphins upset the Patriots in Miami for the second year in a row, this time with a last-minute hook and lateral scoring play in what is known as the "Miracle in Miami". 

On February 4, 2019, the Dolphins hired a long-time Patriots assistant, Brian Flores (who had been with the team since their 2004 Super Bowl-winning season) as the 12th head coach in franchise history. In 2021, the rivalry intensified once again after the Patriots drafted Alabama quarterback Mac Jones, a former college teammate of Dolphins quarterback Tua Tagovailoa, whom Jones backed up in the first half of the 2019 season until a season-ending hip injury from Tagovailoa caused Jones to take the helms at quarterback for Alabama. Both quarterbacks led Alabama to national titles in 2018 and 2021, respectively. Jones and Tagovailoa were also backups to future Philadelphia Eagles quarterback Jalen Hurts during the 2017 season, Jones and Tagovailoa's true freshman years. In 2022, the Dolphins hired former Patriots wide receiver Wes Welker to be their new wide receivers coach. Welker previously played for the Dolphins from 2004–2006 and the hiring would reunite him with Dolphins defensive coordinator and former long-time Patriots assistant Josh Boyer, whom was serving as a defensive assistant and later the defensive backs coach during Welker's tenure with New England (2007–2012).

Also notable is the fact that the Dolphins and Patriots are the only NFL teams to post undefeated regular season records following the NFL-AFL merger. The 1972 Dolphins finished with a 14–0 regular season record and went on to win Super Bowl VII, finishing the only complete perfect season in NFL history, while the 2007 Patriots were the first team to go undefeated in the regular season since the league expanded to 16 games, but famously lost Super Bowl XLII against the New York Giants. Additionally, both teams have had long-tenured coaches in Don Shula and Bill Belichick, respectively.

Season-by-season results

|-
| 1966
| style="| 
| style="| Patriots  20–14
| no game
| Patriots  1–0
| Dolphins join AFL as an expansion team.
|-
| 1967
| Tie 1–1
| style="| Dolphins  41–32
| style="| Patriots  41–10
| Patriots  2–1
| 
|-
| 1968
| style="| 
| style="| Dolphins  38–7
| style="| Dolphins  34–10
| Dolphins  3–2
| 
|-
| 1969
| Tie 1–1
| style="| Patriots  38–23
| style="| Dolphins  17–16
| Dolphins  4–3
| Dolphins' home game at Tampa Stadium.
|-

|-
| 
| Tie 1–1
| style="| Dolphins  37–20
| style="| Patriots  27–14
| Dolphins  5–4
| AFL-NFL merger.  Both teams placed in AFC East. 
|-
| 
| Tie 1–1
| style="| Dolphins  41–3
| style="| Patriots  34–13
| Dolphins  6–5
| Patriots open Foxboro Stadium (then known as Schaefer Stadium). Dolphins lose Super Bowl VI.
|-
| 
| style="| 
| style="| Dolphins  52–0
| style="| Dolphins  37–21
| Dolphins  8–5
| Dolphins complete 17-0 season, win Super Bowl VII. Dolphins hand Patriots worst loss in franchise history in Miami meeting. The 52 points allowed by New England is also a team record.
|-
| 
| style="| 
| style="| Dolphins  44-23
| style="| Dolphins  30-14
| Dolphins  10–5
| Dolphins win Super Bowl VIII.
|-
| 
| Tie 1–1
| style="| Dolphins  41–3
| style="| Patriots  34–13
| Dolphins  11–6
| 
|-
| 
| style="| 
| style="| Dolphins  30–14
| style="| Dolphins  22–14
| Dolphins  13–6
| 
|-
| 
| Tie 1–1
| style="| Dolphins  10–3
| style="| Patriots  22–14
| Dolphins  14–7
| 
|-
| 
| Tie 1–1
| style="| Dolphins  17–5
| style="| Patriots  14–10
| Dolphins  15–8
| 
|-
| 
| Tie 1–1
| style="| Dolphins  23–3
| style="| Patriots  33–24
| Dolphins  16–9
| 
|-
| 
| Tie 1–1
| style="| Dolphins  39–24
| style="| Patriots  28–13
| Dolphins  17–10
|  
|-

|-
| 
| Tie 1–1
| style="| Dolphins  16–13
| style="| Patriots  34–0
| Dolphins  18–11
| 
|-
| 
| style="| 
| style="| Dolphins  24–14
| style="| Dolphins  30–3
| Dolphins  20–11
| 
|-
| 
| style="| 
| no game
| style="| Patriots  3–0
| Dolphins  20–12
| Game in Miami not played due to Players strike reducing season to 9 games.  Game in New England became known as the Snowplow Game. Dolphins lose Super Bowl XVII.
|- style="background:#f2f2f2; font-weight:bold;"
|  1982 Playoffs
| style="| 
| style="| Dolphins  28–13
|  
|  Dolphins  21–12
|  AFC First Round playoffs.
|-
| 
| Tie 1–1
| style="| Dolphins  34–24
| style="| Patriots  17–6
| Dolphins  22–13
|
|-
| 
| style="| 
| style="| Dolphins  28–7
| style="| Dolphins  34–24
| Dolphins  24–13
| Dolphins lose Super Bowl XIX.
|-
| 
| Tie 1–1
| style="| Dolphins  30–27
| style="| Patriots  17–13
| Dolphins  25–14
| Patriots lose Super Bowl XX.
|- style="background:#f2f2f2; font-weight:bold;"
|  1985 Playoffs
| style="| 
| style="| Patriots  31–14
|  
|  Dolphins  25–15
|  AFC Championship Game: Patriots' first win in Miami since 1966 (Dolphins had won 18 straight in Miami).
|-
| 
| style="| 
| style="| Patriots  34–27
| style="| Patriots  34–7
| Dolphins  25–17
| Patriots' first season sweep of Dolphins.
|-
| 
| style="| 
| style="| Patriots  24–10
| style="| Patriots  28–21
| Dolphins  25–19
| Dolphins open Hard Rock Stadium (then known as Joe Robbie Stadium).
|-
| 
| style="| 
| style="| Patriots  6–3
| style="| Patriots  21–10
| Dolphins  25–21
| Patriots win seven straight meetings.
|-
| 
| style="| 
| style="| Dolphins  31–10
| style="| Dolphins  24–10
| Dolphins  27–21
|

|-
| 
| style="| 
| style="| Dolphins  17–10
| style="| Dolphins  27–24
| Dolphins  29–21
| 
|-
| 
| style="| 
| style="| Dolphins  30–21
| style="| Dolphins  20–10
| Dolphins  31–21
| 
|-
| 
| style="| 
| style="| Dolphins  38–17
| style="| Dolphins  16–13(OT)
| Dolphins  33–21
|
|-
| 
| Tie 1–1
| style="| Dolphins  17–13
| style="| Patriots  33–27(OT)
| Dolphins  34–22
| Dolphins win nine straight immediately following Patriots seven-game winning streak. Patriots' overtime win eliminates Dolphins from playoff contention after the Dolphins started 9–2.
|-
| 
| style="| 
| style="| Dolphins  39–35
| style="| Dolphins  23–3
| Dolphins  36–22
|
|-
| 
| Tie 1–1
| style="| Patriots  34–17
| style="| Dolphins  20–3
| Dolphins  37–23
| First time since 1969 in which the away team won both meetings.
|-
| 
| Tie 1–1
| style="| Dolphins  34–7
| style="| Patriots  42–23
| Dolphins  38–24
| Patriots lose Super Bowl XXXI.
|-
| 
| style="| 
| style="| Patriots  14–12
| style="| Patriots  27–24
| Dolphins  38–26
| Game in Miami was the de facto AFC East Championship Game. But due to the Jets' loss the previous day, this game ironically decided whom would finish as the #3 seed and host the loser (as the #6 seeded wild card) in the AFC Wild Card Round the following week.
|- style="background:#f2f2f2; font-weight:bold;"
|  1997 Playoffs
| style="|  
| 
| style="| Patriots  17–3
|  Dolphins  38–27
|  AFC Wild Card playoffs.
|-
| 
| Tie 1–1
| style="| Dolphins  12–9(OT)
| style="| Patriots  26–23
| Dolphins  39–28
| 
|-
| 
| style="| 
| style="| Dolphins  27–17
| style="| Dolphins  31–30
| Dolphins  41–28
|  
|-

|-
| 
| style="| 
| style="| Dolphins  10–3
| style="| Dolphins  27–24
| Dolphins  43–28
| Dolphins clinch AFC East in their road win in week 17.
|-
| 
| Tie 1–1
| style="| Dolphins  30–10
| style="| Patriots  20–13
| Dolphins  44–29
| Patriots win Super Bowl XXXVI.
|-
| 
| Tie 1–1
| style="| Dolphins  26–13
| style="| Patriots  27–24(OT)
| Dolphins  45–30
| Patriots open Gillette Stadium. Patriots deny Dolphins the AFC East title, but both teams are eliminated following the Jets victory later in the day.
|-
| 
| style="| 
| style="| Patriots  
| style="| Patriots  12–0
| Dolphins  45–32
| Patriots win Super Bowl XXXVIII.
|-
| 
| Tie 1–1
| style="| Dolphins  29–28
| style="| Patriots  39–35
| Dolphins  46–33
| 2–11 Dolphins defeat 12–1 Patriots in December game in Miami.  Patriots win Super Bowl XXXIX.
|-
| 
| Tie 1–1
| style="| Patriots  23–16
| style="| Dolphins  28–26
| Dolphins  47–34 
|
|-
| 
| Tie 1–1
| style="| Dolphins  21–0
| style="| Patriots  20–10
| Dolphins  48–35
| 
|-
| 
| style="| 
| style="| Patriots  49–28
| style="| Patriots  28–7
| Dolphins  48–37
| Patriots complete 16–0 regular season, lose Super Bowl XLII.
|-
| 
| Tie 1–1
| style="| Patriots  48–28
| style="| Dolphins  38–13
| Dolphins  49–38
| Dolphins frequently use the "Wildcat" formation to defeat Patriots, this formation gains popularity in the league.  Dolphins win AFC East, the only season the Patriots did not win the division as well as miss the playoffs from 2003–2019. Tom Brady did not play in either game due to a season-ending knee injury in the season opener.
|-
| 
| Tie 1–1
| style="| Dolphins  22–21
| style="| Patriots  27–17
| Dolphins  50–39
| 
|-

|-
| 
| style="| 
| style="| Patriots  41–14
| style="| Patriots  38–7
| Dolphins  50–41
| 
|-
| 
| style="| 
| style="| Patriots  38–24
| style="| Patriots  27–24
| Dolphins  50–43
| Patriots lose Super Bowl XLVI.
|-
| 
| style="| 
| style="| Patriots  23–16
| style="| Patriots  28–0
| Dolphins  50–45
|
|-
| 
| Tie 1–1
| style="| Dolphins  24–20
| style="| Patriots  27–17
| Dolphins  51–46
| Patriots win seven straight meetings from 2010–13.
|-
| 
| Tie 1–1
| style="| Dolphins  33–20
| style="| Patriots  41–14
| Dolphins  52–47
| Patriots win Super Bowl XLIX.
|-
| 
| Tie 1–1
| style="| Dolphins  20–10
| style="| Patriots  36–7
| Dolphins  53–48
| Dolphins spoil the Patriots' bid to clinch the AFC's #1 seed in their Miami meeting in the final week of the regular season.
|-
| 
| style="| 
| style="| Patriots  35–14
| style="| Patriots  31–24
| Dolphins  53–50
| Patriots win Super Bowl LI.
|-
| 
| Tie 1–1
| style="| Dolphins  27–20
| style="| Patriots  35–17
| Dolphins  54–51
| Patriots lose Super Bowl LII.
|-
| 
| Tie 1–1
| style="| Dolphins  34–33
| style="| Patriots  38–7
| Dolphins  55–52
| Patriots win 10 straight home games. Dolphins win with last-minute lateral pass in Miami home game. Patriots win Super Bowl LIII.
|-
| 
| Tie 1–1
| style="| Patriots  43–0
| style="| Dolphins  27–24
| Dolphins  56–53
| Dolphins deny Patriots a first-round bye with Week 17 win; Tom Brady's final regular season game as a Patriot
|-

|-
| 
| Tie 1–1
| style="| Dolphins  22–12
| style="| Patriots  21–11
| Dolphins  57–54
| Patriots sign QB Cam Newton prior to 2020 season. Miami's home win eliminates Patriots from playoff contention for the first time since 2008.
|-
| 
| style="| 
| style="| Dolphins  33–24
| style="| Dolphins  17–16
| Dolphins  59–54
| Dolphins sweep Patriots for the first time since 2000.
|-
| 
| Tie 1–1
| style="| Dolphins  20–7
| style="| Patriots  23–21
| Dolphins  60–55
|
|- 

|-
| AFL regular season
| style="|Dolphins 4–3
| Tie 2–2
| Dolphins 2–1
|
|-
| NFL regular season
| style="|Dolphins 55–50
| Dolphins 38–14 
| Patriots 36–17
| 
|-
| AFL and NFL regular season
| style="|Dolphins 59–53
| Dolphins 40–16 
| Patriots 37–19
| 
|-
| NFL postseason
| style="|Patriots 2–1
| Tie 1–1
| Patriots 1–0
| AFC Wild Card/ First Round playoffs: 1982, 1997. AFC Championship Game: 1985
|-
| Regular and postseason 
| style="|Dolphins 60–55
| Dolphins 41–17 
| Patriots 38–19
| 
|-

Connections between the teams

Coaches/executives

Players

References

National Football League rivalries
Miami Dolphins
New England Patriots
New England Patriots rivalries
Miami Dolphins rivalries